Essex County is located in the northeastern part of the U.S. state of New Jersey, and is one of the centrally located counties in the New York metropolitan area. As of the 2020 census, the county was the state's second-most populous county, with a population of 863,728, its highest decennial count ever and an increase of 79,759 (+10.2%) from the 2010 census count of 783,969, which in turn reflected a decrease of 1.2% (9,664 fewer residents) from the 793,633 enumerated in the 2000 Census. For 2021, the Population Estimates Program calculated a population of 854,917, which was ranked third of the state's 21 counties (with Middlesex County ranked second).  Its county seat is Newark, with a 2020 census population of 311,549, making it the most populous city in the state.

In 2015, the county had a per capita personal income of $60,030, the eighth-highest in New Jersey and 153rd highest of 3,113 counties in the U.S.  The Bureau of Economic Analysis ranked the county as having the 94th-highest per capita income of all 3,113 counties in the U.S. and seventh-highest in New Jersey in 2009. The county is part of the North Jersey region.

History

Etymolgy
The county is named after Essex, a county in the East of England.

History
Based on data from the 2010 census, Essex County is the 14th-most densely populated county in the United States, and was ranked second in the state after Hudson County (which ranked sixth in the nation at 13,731.4 per square mile).Newark, with a population density of 11,458.3 people per square mile, is the largest municipality in the county both in terms of land area (24.19 square miles) and population (277,140), while Caldwell is the smallest in terms of land area (1.17 square miles) and Essex Fells has the smallest population (2,113). Many of the county's smallest municipalities have population densities that are comparable to those of many big cities, and are well above the state's average which in turn is the highest in the nation.

Like many of the counties of Northern New Jersey near New York City—which tend to have sharp divides between relatively rich suburban neighborhoods and less wealthy, more densely populated cities nearby—the eastern region of Essex County tends to be poorer and more urbanized, while the western parts tend to be more affluent and suburban. The wide area of Eastern Essex has significant pockets of high population, high building density, high poverty, and high crime rates. Within this general area, however, are numerous areas comprised of safe, mixed and middle-income neighborhoods of diverse populations. For example, north and west sides of Newark have well-kept suburban areas such as Vailsburg and Forest Hill. The east side of Newark is the Ironbound, a working-class Brazilian and Portuguese community. East Orange is home to the Presidential Estate neighborhood, a well-kept area of large, pre-war, single-family homes. Belleville and Bloomfield are suburbs with historic Italian communities that, in spite of retaining a core Italian-American population, now have many immigrants from Latin America and Asia. As of the 2000 Census, 36% of Nutley residents indicated that they were of Italian ancestry, the 12th-highest of any municipality in the nation and third-highest in New Jersey.

Beginning at about the turn of the century, this region led the state in the rebuilding and rehab of its housing stock. In the 2000s, Newark led the state in the issuance of building permits. Many reasons were cited: citywide incentives to encourage construction development, an improving local economy, the rising demand of low-cost housing so close to Manhattan. Newark has since then become one of the fastest-growing cities in the entire Northeast, and reported a gain in median income and drop in poverty rate. This is a turnaround from the deterioration and abandonment experienced in the post-riot 1970s, 1980s and early part of the 1990s.

Crime in this part of the county has traditionally been among the highest in the state and the country as well, but recently has also seen significant declines, mirroring its large neighbor to the east, New York City. By 2006, crime in Newark had fallen 60% over the previous decade to its lowest levels in 40 years. Neighboring East Orange has also experienced a decline in crimes, dropping 50% in the three years (2005 to 2007). While crime rates have fallen significantly in these cities in recent years, they nonetheless remain high here compared to national crime statistics, as well as Irvington, and Orange. In 2008, Newark had 67 homicides, down from 105 in 2007 and the record of 161 murders set in 1981.

In contrast, Western Essex tends to be more suburban and affluent. Within this region are some of the most diverse and racially integrated municipalities in the state and nation, including Montclair, West Orange, South Orange and Maplewood. Many of these municipalities are well-known magnets for people moving from New York City, such as Glen Ridge, Montclair, Verona, Cedar Grove, South Orange and West Orange. The communities of Livingston, West Caldwell, South Orange, Maplewood, Millburn, North Caldwell, and Essex Fells are some of the wealthiest towns in the county. Short Hills (in Millburn), South Orange, West Orange, and Livingston have large Jewish communities. Short Hills has a popular upscale shopping mall, The Mall at Short Hills located near affluent communities in Morris and Union counties.

As the poorest place in the county, Newark has a median household income of $33,025 and a per capita income of $17,198; at the other extreme, Essex Fells, one of the wealthier places in the county and the 4th wealthiest municipality in the state, has a median household income of $174,432 and a per capita income of $89,316.

Essex County was the first county in the country to create a county park system (Essex County Park System), to ensure that it did not lose all its land to development. Some of the county's municipalities, especially Newark, The Oranges, and The Caldwells were seen on episodes of the HBO mob drama The Sopranos, which was set in North Caldwell.

Essex was originally formed as one of four administrative districts within Province of East Jersey in 1675, together with Bergen, Middlesex and Monmouth districts. Essex County was formed within East Jersey on March 7, 1683. The county was named after the English county of Essex. When the provinces of East Jersey and West Jersey were combined in 1702, the county boundaries were retained. Portions of Essex were taken in 1741 and transferred to Somerset County. In 1837, Passaic County was formed from portions of Essex and Bergen counties. In 1857, Union County was created from parts of Essex County.

Geography

The county rises from generally flat in the east to the twin ridges of the Watchung Mountains in the western half, beyond which the land lowers again into the Passaic River valley.

The lowest point is sea level, at Newark Bay.

Climate
All of Essex County has a humid subtropical climate (Cfa) if the -3 °C isotherm is used. If the 0 °C isotherm is used, Cfa only exists in eastern Newark and the rest of the county has a hot-summer humid continental climate (Dfa). However temperatures do vary in various locations. In Newark, Eastern Essex County, and Southern/Southeastern Essex County, temperatures are relatively cool to hot, even in the winter months. Western Essex County has similar temperatures to Eastern Essex, but the elevation increase within the Watchung Mountains allows for some minor differences. An example would be that in January on Interstate 280 it could be raining in East Orange. At the top of the hill it could be snowing because of the 3 to 4 degree temperature differences.

In Roseland, average monthly temperatures range from 29.2 °F in January to 74.6 °F in July.

Demographics

2020 census

2010 census

The non-Hispanic white population was 33.2%.

The county had 76,200 Jewish residents according to the 2002 results of the National Jewish Population Survey.

Economy
Based on data from the Bureau of Economic Analysis, Essex County had a gross domestic product (GDP) of $52.3 billion in 2018, which was ranked 4th in the state and represented an increase of 1.4% from the previous year.

Government

County Government
Essex County is governed by a County Executive and a nine-member Board of County Commissioners, who administer all county business. Essex joins Atlantic, Bergen, Hudson and Mercer counties as one of the five of 21 New Jersey counties with an elected executive. The County Executive is elected by a direct vote of the electorate. Nine commissioners are elected to serve three-year concurrent terms of office. Five of the commissioners represent districts; four are elected from the county on an at-large basis. At an annual organization meeting, the commissioners choose a Commissioner President and Vice-President from among its members to serve one-year terms. The executive's term and those of all commissioners end on December 31, 2022. In 2016, commissioners were paid $37,249 and the commissioner president was paid an annual salary of $38,211; commissioner salaries were the second-highest in the state, behind Hudson County. the county executive was paid $161,615 in 2015.

, the Essex County Executive is Democrat Joseph N. DiVincenzo Jr., whose four-year term of office ends December 31, 2026. Essex County's Commissioners are (with terms for president and vice president ending every December 31):

In February 2019, Romaine Graham was appointed to fill the seat expiring in December 2024 that had been held by Lebby Jones until her death the previous month. Graham served on an interim basis until basis until the November 2019 general election, when she was chosen to serve the balance of the term of office.

Pursuant to Article VII Section II of the New Jersey State Constitution, each county in New Jersey is required to have three elected administrative officials known as "constitutional officers."  These officers are the County Clerk and County Surrogate (both elected for five-year terms of office) and the County Sheriff (elected for a three-year term). Essex County is one of two counties statewide that has an elected Register of Deeds. Essex County's constitutional officers are:

The Acting Essex County Prosecutor is Theodore N. Stephens II, who was appointed as acting prosecutor in September 2018. Stephens previously served as Essex County Surrogate from 2012 until his appointment as Acting Prosecutor. Essex County constitutes Vicinage 5 of the New Jersey Superior Court, which is seated at the Veterans' Courthouse in Newark, which also houses the Criminal Part; civil and probate cases are heard at both the historic Essex County Courthouse and at the Essex County Hall of Records, also in Newark, while family and chancery cases are heard at the Robert N. Wilentz Court Complex, also in Newark, with additional facilities in East Orange. The Assignment Judge for the vicinage is Sallyanne Floria.

Federal representatives 

Three federal Congressional Districts cover the county, including portions of the 8th, 10th and 11th Districts.

State representatives 
The 22 municipalities of Essex County are represented by six separate legislative districts.

Law enforcement

Law enforcement at the county level is provided by the Essex County Prosecutor's Office and the Essex County Sheriff's Office. The Essex County Police was completely absorbed by the sheriff's office by 2007. Essex County College and its satellite locations are patrolled by the Essex County College Police Department.

In 2021, the Essex County Correctional Facility in Newark ended its contract with U.S. Immigration and Customs Enforcement to hold undocumented immigrants, instead entering into a contract with Union County, New Jersey, to house their inmates.

Politics  
In presidential elections, the county has long been Democratic and is the most Democratic county in the state. It was the only county in the state to be won by Walter Mondale in 1984. As of October 1, 2021, there were a total of 571,960 registered voters in Essex County, of whom 299,613 (52.4%) were registered as Democrats, 58,618 (10.2%) were registered as Republicans and 208,422 (36.4%) were registered as unaffiliated. There were 5,307 voters (0.9%) registered to other parties.

In the 2020 U.S. presidential election, Joe Biden carried the county by a 55.4% margin over Donald Trump, the highest winning margin in any county in New Jersey, even as Biden only carried the state by 15.9% over Trump. This is actually a slight decline from the 2016 U.S. presidential election, where Hillary Clinton carried the county by a 56.8% margin over Trump. Democrats have won every presidential election in the 21st century with over 70% of the vote and Republicans have not won the county in a statewide contest since the 1985 gubernatorial election.

|}

In the 2009 gubernatorial election, Democratic Governor Jon Corzine received 67.2% of the vote (122,640 votes) to Republican Chris Christe's 27.5% (50,240 votes). In the 2013 gubernatorial election, Democrat Barbara Buono received 61.8% (95,747 total votes) to Republican Governor Chris Christe's 37% of the vote (57,353 total votes), thus making Essex County only one of two of the state's counties to back the Democratic candidate, alongside neighboring Hudson County. In the 2017 gubernatorial election, Democrat Phil Murphy received 79.5% (129,470 votes cast) to Republican Kim Guandano's 18.8% (30,633 votes cast). In the 2021 gubernatorial election, Democratic Governor Phil Murphy received 74.0% of the vote (132,520 votes) to Republican Jack Ciattarelli's 25.4% (45,542 votes), making it Murphy's strongest county.

Education

Higher education
Essex County has five public and five private institutions. Another private college closed in 1995.

Public
 Essex County College – a two-year community college that offers A.A., A.S., and A.A.S. degrees, the school opened in 1968. The school's main campus is in the University Heights section of Newark, with a satellite campus in West Caldwell.
 Montclair State University – founded in 1908, the school serves more than 20,000 students at its campus covering Montclair, Little Falls and Clifton.
 New Jersey Institute of Technology (NJIT) – located in Newark's University Heights section, the school was established in 1881 as Newark Technical School, the school has a total enrollment of 11,400 undergraduate and graduate students.
 Rutgers University–Newark – the school has an enrollment of 12,000 and dates back to the 1908 establishment of the New Jersey Law School which became a part of Rutgers University under legislation that incorporated the University of Newark into Rutgers.
 New Jersey Medical School – dates back to its establishment in Newark in 1956 as the Seton Hall College of Medicine and Dentistry of New Jersey, and became part of Rutgers University in 2013.

Private
 Berkeley College – Newark
 Bloomfield College – located Bloomfield and founded in 1868.
 Caldwell University – founded in 1939 as a Catholic liberal arts college by the Sisters of Saint Dominic, the school has 2,200 students at its campus in Caldwell.
 Seton Hall University –founded in 1856 and affiliated with the Roman Catholic Archdiocese of Newark, the school has more than 10,000 students enrolled on its campus in South Orange.
 Seton Hall University School of Law – located in Newark, it is the state's only private law school.
 Upsala College (defunct) – founded in 1893, the school moved in 1924 to East Orange and closed in 1995. It is now the site of East Orange Campus High School, which opened in 2002.

School districts
School districts in Essex County include:

K-12

 Belleville School District
 Bloomfield Public Schools
 Caldwell-West Caldwell Public Schools – Consolidated
 Cedar Grove Schools
 East Orange School District
 Essex County Vocational Technical Schools
 Glen Ridge Public Schools
 Irvington Public Schools
 Livingston Public Schools
 Millburn Township Public Schools
 Montclair Public Schools
 Newark Public Schools
 Nutley Public Schools
 Orange Board of Education
 South Orange-Maplewood School District – Consolidated
 Verona Public Schools
 West Orange Public Schools

Secondary
 West Essex Regional School District

Elementary
 Essex Fells School District
 Fairfield School District
 North Caldwell Public Schools
 Roseland School District

Transportation

Roads and highways

Essex County is traversed by a number of highways.  Three primary interstates and one auxiliary cross the county. This includes two long distance main interstates, one north–south (Interstate 95) from Miami and New Brunswick, Canada signed as the New Jersey Turnpike and one east–west Interstate 80 from San Francisco and Teaneck. East-West Interstate 78 from near Harrisburg and New York City also crosses the county. All of these only have interchanges in one municipality in the county, Newark for I-95 and I-78 and Fairfield for I-80. Interstate 280 passes through the county in a northeast–southwest direction and has exits in Roseland, Livingston, West Orange, Orange, East Orange and Newark, making it one of the most important roads for intracounty travel.

Essex County also has four U.S. Routes that cross it. Route 1/9 are concurrent and a freeway throughout their length in the county. They pass through Newark from Elizabeth in Union County to Kearny in Hudson County. It crosses over the Passaic River on the Pulaski Skyway, which bans trucks, so just before it leaves the county in the north Truck 1/9 splits for the traffic that is not allowed on the bridge. Truck 1/9 is also a freeway its entire length in the county. U.S. Route 22 eastern terminus is in Newark the only municipality it crosses in the county. It is a freeway along it route in Essex County. It connects Newark with points to the east. The last U.S. Route in the county is U.S. Route 46, which passes through Fairfield, where it is a major commercial road that parallels Interstate 80.

The most important state road in the county is the Garden State Parkway which passes north–south through the county, connecting Union Township in the south in Union County to Clifton in the north in Passaic County. It is a toll road, a freeway, and bans trucks of more than 7,000 pounds during its entire length in the county.  It has one interchange in Irvington, one in Newark, two in East Orange, and four in Bloomfield. Outside the county, it is the longest road of any kind in the state.

New Jersey Route 7 is a major arterial road in Nutley and Belleville. It has two discontinuous sections. The southern section starts at an overpass for Route 21 and passes over the Belleville Turnpike Bridge into border between Hudson and Bergen counties. The northern section starts at the Newark/Belleville border passes through Belleville and Nutley until in crosses into Clifton.

Other highways in the county include:
 Route 10
 Route 21
 Route 23
 Route 24
 Route 27 (only in Newark)
 Route 124
 Route 159
 Eisenhower Parkway

Buses
There are many buses that operate around the county, with NJ Transit (NJT) headquarters located just behind Newark Penn Station, a transit hub in the eastern part of the county. There are two major bus terminals in the county, Newark Penn Station and the Irvington Bus Terminal. DeCamp Bus Lines, Community Coach, and OurBus operate buses from Essex County to the Port Authority Bus Terminal in New York City. Some of the NJ Transit bus lines follow former streetcar lines.

Rail
Essex County has a large rail network, but most train service is geared toward the heavily utilized Newark/New York City commute. All of the passenger rail lines in the county are electrified, although many  trains that continue on to non-electrified lines use dual-mode or diesel push-pull locomotives.

Commuter rail
NJ Transit has five lines that make stops in the county. All of them stop at either Newark Penn Station or Newark Broad Street Station. The Northeast Corridor Line from Trenton with connections from Philadelphia's 30th Street Station, Camden, and Princeton has stops at Newark Airport and Newark Penn Stations before continuing to Secaucus Junction and New York Penn Station. The North Jersey Coast Line from Bay Head or Long Branch also stops at Newark Airport and Newark Penn Stations before continuing to Secaucus Junction and New York Penn Station or Hoboken Terminal. The Raritan Valley Line from High Bridge usually terminates in Newark Penn Station, but mid-day trains continue to New York and one eastbound morning train terminates at Hoboken Terminal.

The Montclair-Boonton Line from Hackettstown or Little Falls has six stations in Montclair, one in Glen Ridge, and two in Bloomfield before reaching Newark Broad Street Station and continuing to Secaucus Junction and New York Penn Station or Hoboken Terminal. The Morris and Essex Lines from Hackettstown and Peapack-Gladstone has two stops in Millburn, one in Maplewood, and two each in South Orange, Orange and East Orange before reaching Newark Broad Street and continuing to Secaucus Junction and New York Penn Station or Hoboken Terminal.

Light rail

The Newark Light Rail is completely contained within the county. It has 17 stations in Newark, Belleville, and Bloomfield and also operates out of Newark Penn Station. It is composed of two lines: the Newark City Subway and the Broad Street Extension.

The Newark City Subway is the only survivor of the many street car lines that once crossed New Jersey, although it no longer uses street cars. It survived in part because it does not include street running, instead following the abandoned Morris Canal right of way before going underground. It has one station in Bloomfield and one in Belleville on the old Orange Branch of the New York & Greenwood Lake Service of the Erie Railroad before entering Newark and turning onto the Morris Canal right of way. From there it follows Branch Brook Park before turning into downtown Newark as a subway. It has nine stops in Newark before terminating in Newark Penn Station.

The Broad Street Extension was built to provide connections between Newark Penn Station and Newark Broad Street Station and service to the waterfront of Newark. Leaving Penn Station, the line comes up from the subway and runs on streets or at grade for most of its length. It stops at NJPAC/Center Street, Atlantic Street, and Riverfront Stadium before reaching Broad Street Station. From Broad Street it takes a different route stopping at Washington Park and NJPAC/Center Street before arriving at Penn Station.

Rapid transit
The PATH also operates out of Newark Penn Station. It has direct service to Harrison, Jersey City, and Lower Manhattan. With a free transfer, the PATH also provides service to Hoboken, as well as Greenwich Village, Chelsea, and Midtown Manhattan.

Intercity rail
Amtrak has two stations in the county, Newark Penn Station and Newark Airport, both on the Northeast Corridor. Newark Penn Station has service on the only high speed train in the Western Hemisphere, the Acela Express, to Boston, Philadelphia, Baltimore, and Washington, D.C. Newark Penn Station also offers services on the Cardinal to Chicago; Carolinian to Charlotte; Crescent to New Orleans; Keystone Service to Harrisburg; Palmetto to Charleston; Pennsylvanian to Pittsburgh; Northeast Regional to Newport News, Norfolk, and Lynchburg; Silver Star and Silver Meteor to Miami; and Vermonter to St. Albans all with intermediate stops. Newark Airport is served by Northeast Regional and Keystone Service trains.

Monorail
Newark Liberty International Airport has a monorail called AirTrain Newark that connects the terminals, four parking areas, and the Newark Liberty International Airport Station on the Northeast Corridor. The monorail is free except for service to and from the train station.

Airports
Newark Liberty International Airport is a major commercial airport located in the southeast section of the county in Newark and Elizabeth in Union County. It is one of the New York Metropolitan airports operated by Port Authority of New York and New Jersey.  It is a hub for United Airlines. It is also a leading cargo airport and is a hub for FedEx Express and Kalitta Air.

The Essex County Airport in Fairfield is a general aviation airport.

Ports
Port Newark-Elizabeth Marine Terminal is a major component of the Port of New York and New Jersey. Located on the Newark Bay it serves as the principal container ship facility for goods entering and leaving New York-Newark metropolitan area, and the northeastern quadrant of North America. It consists of two components – Port Newark and the Elizabeth Marine Terminal (sometimes called "Port Elizabeth") – which exist side by side and are run conjointly by the Port Authority of New York and New Jersey. The facility is located within the boundaries of the two cities of Newark and Elizabeth, just east of the New Jersey Turnpike and Newark Liberty International Airport.

Bridges
Several important or noteworthy bridges currently or historically exist at least partially in the county. Most of them cross Newark Bay or the Passaic River into Hudson or Bergen counties. The Newark Bay Bridge carries Interstate 78 over Newark Bay from Newark to Bayonne and is currently the most southern bridge crossing the bay. The Upper Bay Bridge, a vertical-lift bridge located just north of the Newark Bay Bridge, carries a freight train line over the bay from Newark to Bayonne.

The PD Draw is an abandoned and partially dismantled railroad bridge across the Passaic River from Newark to Kearny. The Lincoln Highway Passaic River Bridge carries Truck 1/9 across the Passaic River and is currently the southernmost crossing of the river before it reaches the bay. It is a vertical-lift bridge and was the route that the Lincoln Highway used to cross the river. The Pulaski Skyway, the most famous bridge entirely in New Jersey, carries Route 1/9 across the Passaic River, Kearny Point, and the Hackensack River from Newark through Kearny to Jersey City.

The Point-No-Point Bridge is a railroad swing bridge that carries a freight line across the Passaic River between Newark and Kearny. The Jackson Street Bridge is a historic vehicular swing bridge across the Passaic from Newark to Harrison.  The Dock Bridge, listed on the National Register of Historic Places carries four tracks of the Northeast Corridor rail line and two tracks of the PATH on two vertical lift spans from Newark Penn Station to Harrison.

The Center Street Bridge is a former railroad, rapid transit, and road bridge connecting Newark and Harrison. The Bridge Street Bridge is another vehicular swing bridge across the Passaic from Newark to Harrison, as is the Clay Street Bridge, a swing bridge that connects Newark and East Newark.

Municipalities

The 22 municipalities in Essex County (with 2010 Census data for population, housing units and area in square miles) are: Other, unincorporated communities in the county are listed next to their parent municipality. Most of these areas are census-designated places that have been created by the United States Census Bureau for enumeration purposes within a Township. Other communities and enclaves that exist within a municipality are marked as non-CDP next to the name.

Secession
The municipalities of western Essex County have discussed secession from the county, to create a new county or be annexed to Morris County, spurred mainly by a belief that tax policy benefits the poorer, urban, eastern portions of the county at the expense of the wealthier, more suburban municipalities in the west of the county. From 2001 to 2003, Millburn, Montclair and Roseland all held nonbinding ballot referendums on the issue. Then-Montclair mayor Robert J. Russo gave a statement in 2003 about secession, "I've watched Essex County burden our people, with very little to show for it. We're fiscally conservative here and socially progressive -- and we're finally rebelling."

Points of interest

Essex County was the first county in the United States to have its own parks department. It is called the Essex County Park System.
 Anderson Park Montclair
 Becker Park, Roseland
 Branch Brook Park, Newark / Belleville (the country's oldest county park)
 Brookdale Park, Montclair / Bloomfield
 Crane House Site Boulder Monument, corner of Valley Road and Claremont Ave, Montclair; formerly the smallest park in the world, now #2.
 Eagle Rock Reservation, West Orange / Montclair
 Glenfield Park, Montclair / Glen Ridge
 Grover Cleveland Park, Caldwell / Essex Fells
 Hilltop Reservation, Caldwell / Cedar Grove / North Caldwell / Verona
 Irvington Park, Irvington
 Ivy Hill Park, Newark
 Kip's Castle Park, Verona / Montclair
 Mills Reservation, Cedar Grove / Upper Montclair
 Orange Park, Orange / East Orange
 South Mountain Reservation, West Orange / South Orange / Millburn / Maplewood
 Vailsburg Park, Newark
 Thomas Edison National Historical Park, West Orange
 Verona Park, Verona
 Watsessing Park, Bloomfield / East Orange
 Weequahic Park, Newark
 West Essex Park, West Caldwell / Roseland
 West Side Park, Newark
 Yanticaw Park, Nutley

 Prudential Center, Newark. Opened in 2007, home of the New Jersey Devils of the National Hockey League and the Seton Hall University men's basketball team. It was formerly the home of the New Jersey Nets from 2010 until 2012.
 The Mall at Short Hills, Short Hills, Milburn. Opened in 1961, is 10 miles west from Newark Liberty International Airport.
 Livingston Mall, Livingston.
 Christ Church Cemetery & Mausoleum, Belleville. This cemetery was originally the first Episcopal Church in the area, established in 1746 by a land grant signed by King George II. The original burial ground still exists today, accompanied by a newer mausoleum.
 Saint Stephen's Cemetery & The Chapel at Short Hills, Short Hills. Saint Stephen's Cemetery has been serving NJ residents since 1858. The Chapel at Short Hills was later added to accommodate above-ground burials.

There are various attractions in Essex County, such as The Newark Museum of Art, New Jersey Historical Society, Montclair Art Museum, Turtle Back Zoo, Thomas Edison National Historical Park, and Grover Cleveland Birthplace.  Essex County is home to part of the Port Newark–Elizabeth Marine Terminal, the largest port on the East Coast and the third largest in the United States, and two airports: Newark Liberty International Airport and Essex County Airport.

See also

 National Register of Historic Places listings in Essex County, New Jersey
 Essex County Resource Recovery Facility

References

External links
 Official website

 
1683 establishments in New Jersey
Counties in the New York metropolitan area
North Jersey
Populated places established in 1683